Tarachephia is a monotypic moth genus of the family Noctuidae erected by George Hampson in 1926. Its only species, Tarachephia hueberi, was first described by Nikolay Grigoryevich Erschoff in 1874. It is found in Turkestan. It is found in Syria, Iraq, Iran, the Transcaspian Region, Uzbekistan, Turkmenistan, Afghanistan and Israel.

There is one generation per year. Adults are on wing from March to May.

References

External links

Image. Archived March 4, 2016.

Monotypic moth genera
Armadini
Insects of Turkey
Moths of the Middle East